The Journal of Finance is a peer-reviewed academic journal published by Wiley-Blackwell on behalf of the American Finance Association. It was established in 1946 and is considered to be one of the premier finance journals.  The editor-in-chief is Antoinette Schoar. According to the Journal Citation Reports, the journal has a 2021 impact factor of 7.870, ranking it 6th out of 111 journals in the category "Business, Finance" and 16th out of 381 journals in the category "Economics".

Editors
The editorial board consists of the editor, co-editors, and associate editors. The current editor is Antoinette Schoar (MIT). 

The following persons are or have been editor-in-chief of the journal:

Awards
Each year the associate editors vote for the best papers published in the journal. The Smith Breeden Prize is awarded for the best finance papers and the Brattle Prize for the best corporate finance research papers.

References

External links

Finance journals
Publications established in 1946
Wiley-Blackwell academic journals
Bimonthly journals
English-language journals
Academic journals associated with learned and professional societies